The Schmidt-Samoa cryptosystem is an asymmetric cryptographic technique, whose security, like Rabin depends on the difficulty of integer factorization.  Unlike Rabin this algorithm does not produce an ambiguity in the decryption at a cost of encryption speed.

Key generation

 Choose two large distinct primes p and q and compute 
 Compute 

Now N is the public key and d is the private key.

Encryption

To encrypt a message m we compute the ciphertext as

Decryption

Example:
 
 

Now to verify:

Security
The algorithm, like Rabin, is based on the difficulty of factoring the modulus N, which is a distinct advantage over RSA.
That is, it can be shown that if there exists an algorithm that can decrypt arbitrary messages, then this algorithm can be used to factor N.

Efficiency
The algorithm processes decryption as fast as Rabin and RSA, however it has much slower encryption since the sender must compute a full exponentiation.

Since encryption uses a fixed known exponent an addition chain may be used to optimize the encryption process.  The cost of producing an optimal addition chain can be amortized over the life of the public key, that is, it need only be computed once and cached.

References
 A New Rabin-type Trapdoor Permutation Equivalent to Factoring and Its Applications

Public-key encryption schemes